Back to Earth is the eighth studio album by rock band Rare Earth, which was released in 1975. Jerry LaCroix replaced departed lead singer Peter Hoorelbeke and Reggie McBride replaced departed bassist Michael Urso. Hoorelbeke, Urso and producer Tom Baird went on to form the group HUB and release two albums Hub (1975) and Cheata (1976) on Capitol Records.

Track listing
 "It Makes You Happy (But It Ain't Gonna Last Too Long)" (Gabriel Katona, Paul Warren) – 4:08
 "Wallking Schtick" (Gabriel Katona) – 4:14
 "Keeping Me Out of the Storm" (Johnny Stevenson, Paul Warren) – 5:22
 "Delta Melody" (Doug Duffey) – 4:59
 "Happy Song" (Doug Duffey) – 4:54
 "Let Me Be Your Sunshine" (Gabriel Katona, Paul Warren) – 2:51
 "Boogie With Me Children" (Jerry LaCroix) – 3:26
 "City Life" (Dennis Provisor) – 4:56

Personnel 
Rare Earth
Jerry LaCroix – lead vocals, tenor saxophone, flute
Gil Bridges – flute, alto saxophone, backing vocals
Ray Monette – guitar
Paul Warren – guitar, backing vocals
Gabriel Katona – keyboards, backing vocals
Reggie McBride – bass, backing vocals
Barry "Frosty" Smith – drums, percussion
Eddie Guzman – congas, percussion
Technical
Rik Pekkonen – engineer

References

Rare Earth (band) albums
1975 albums
Albums produced by Stewart Levine